Harry Keith White (born February 5, 1946 in Huntington, West Virginia) is an American politician and a Democratic member of the West Virginia House of Delegates representing District 21 since January 2003. White served consecutively from January 1997 until January 2003 and non-consecutively from his appointment September 11, 1992 until January 1995 in a District 19 seat. He is 75 years old

Education
White earned his BBA from Marshall University.

Elections
2012 White was challenged in the May 8, 2012 Democratic Primary, winning with 2,622 votes (83.7%), and won the November 6, 2012 General election with 3,816 votes (72.6%) against Republican nominee Roger Stacy.
Early 1990s Initially appointed to District 19, White was elected in the 1992 Democratic Primary and the November 3, 1992 General election.
1996 White and Steven Kominar won the 1996 Democratic Primary and the November 5, 1996 General election.
1998 White and Representative Kominar were challenged in the six-way 1998 Democratic Primary where both placed and were unopposed for the November 3, 1998 General election.
2000 White and Representative Kominar were challenged in the six-way 2000 Democratic Primary where both placed and were unopposed for the November 7, 2000 General election.
2002 Redistricted to District 21, with incumbent Representative Earnie Kuhn redistricted to District 18, White was unopposed for both the 2002 Democratic Primary and the November 5, 2002 General election.
2004 White was unopposed for the 2004 Democratic Primary and won the November 2, 2004 General election against Republican nominee James Saunders.
2006 White and returning 2004 Republican opponent James Saunders were both unopposed for their 2006 primaries, setting up a rematch; White won the November 7, 2006 General election against Saunders.
2008 White was unopposed for both the May 13, 2008 Democratic Primary, winning with 3,478 votes, and the November 4, 2008 General election, winning with 3,461 votes.
2010 White was unopposed for both the  May 11, 2010 Democratic Primary, winning with 2,323 votes, and the November 2, 2010 General election, winning with 2,593 votes.

References

External links
Official page at the West Virginia Legislature

Harry White at Ballotpedia
Harry Keith White at OpenSecrets

1943 births
Living people
Marshall University alumni
Democratic Party members of the West Virginia House of Delegates
Politicians from Huntington, West Virginia
People from Gilbert, West Virginia
United States Navy officers